In enzymology, an ethanolamine kinase is an enzyme that catalyzes the chemical reaction

ATP + ethanolamine  ADP + O-phosphoethanolamine

Thus, the two substrates of this enzyme are ATP and ethanolamine, whereas its two products are ADP and O-phosphoethanolamine.

This enzyme belongs to the family of transferases, specifically those transferring phosphorus-containing groups (phosphotransferases) with an alcohol group as acceptor.  The systematic name of this enzyme class is ATP:ethanolamine O-phosphotransferase. Other names in common use include ethanolamine kinase (phosphorylating), and ethanolamine phosphokinase.  This enzyme participates in glycerophospholipid metabolism.

References

 
 
 

EC 2.7.1
Enzymes of unknown structure